Hwange District is an administrative district in  northwestern Zimbabwe, in southern Africa.

Location
The district is located in Matabeleland North Province, in northwest Zimbabwe, bordering Botswana and the Republic of Zambia.

Overview
Hwange  District is primarily a mining district. Large coal deposits are found in the district and several large coal mines are located there, including Hwange Colliery, the largest coal mine in Zimbabwe. The district headquarters is located in Hwange, a city which lies of the Bulawayo-Victoria Falls Road, (A8 Highway), with an estimated population of 33,210 as of 2004.

Population
The current population of Hwange District is 62,670.

See also
 Districts of Zimbabwe
 Provinces of Zimbabwe

References